Thiesian Democratic Front (in French: Front Démocratique Thiesois) was a political party in Thies, Senegal. FDT merged into the Senegalese Popular Bloc.

Sources
Nzouankeu, Jacques Mariel. Les partis politiques sénégalais. Dakar: Editions Clairafrique, 1984.

Political parties in Senegal